The 5th National Spelling Bee was held at the National Museum in Washington, D.C. on May 21, 1929, by the Louisville Courier-Journal. Scripps-Howard would not sponsor the Bee until 1941.

The winner was 12-year-old Virginia Hogan of Nebraska, a student at St. John's Parochial School in Omaha, correctly spelling the word luxuriance, followed by asceticism. In second place came Viola Strbac of Milwaukee, Wisconsin (who had failed to properly spell luxuriance), followed by Teru Hayashi of Ventnor City, New Jersey, a Japanese-American who stumbled on "panacea".

Hogan was first bee winner from her state. She died in Fremont, Nebraska in 1976.(24 November 1976). Spelling champ dies, Lincoln Star (married name Virginia Hogan McDonald) Nebraska did not have another winner until the 40th Bee in 1967.

References

05
1929 in education
1929 in Washington, D.C.
May 1929 events